Slatton is a surname. Notable people with the surname include:

 C. S. Slatton (1895–1951), American judge
 James Slatton (born 1947), American water polo player
 Traci L. Slatton (born 1963), American author

See also
Slaton (surname)